Capital punishment is a legal penalty in the U.S. state of South Carolina. Between 1718 and 2021, more than 680 people have been executed in South Carolina. After a nationwide capital punishment ban was overturned in 1976, South Carolina has executed 43 people.

Since 2011, no one has been executed in the state due to pharmaceutical companies not wanting to sell the drugs needed for lethal injections. Lethal injection has been the legalized primary form of execution since 1995. Under the passage of Act 43 of 2021, executions are expected to resume with the electric chair as the primary form of execution. In March 2022, the South Carolina Department of Corrections announced they were ready to carry out executions by firing squad. Inmates will now have the choice to be executed via electrocution or firing squad; with electrocution being the primary method.

Legal process 
When the prosecution seeks the death penalty, sentence is not passed by the judge. The sentence is decided by the jury and must be unanimous.

In case of a hung jury during the penalty phase of the trial, a life sentence is issued, even if a single juror opposed death (there is no retrial).

The governor has the power of clemency with respect to death sentences.

The methods of execution are lethal injection, electrocution, and firing squad.

On January 30, 2019, South Carolina's Senate voted 26–13 in favor of a revived proposal to bring back the electric chair and add firing squads to its execution options. On May 14, 2021, South Carolina Governor Henry McMaster signed a bill into law which brought back the electric chair as the default method of execution (in the event lethal injection was unavailable) and added the firing squad (if the offender requests it) to the list of execution options. This made South Carolina the first state to use a method other than lethal injection as its primary execution method since 2009, when Nebraska switched over to that method, also from electrocution. South Carolina has not performed executions in over a decade, and its lethal injection drugs expired in 2013. Pharmaceutical companies have since refused to sell drugs for lethal injection. The law is Act 43 of 2021.

Capital crimes 
Murder can be punished by death if the crime involved at least one of 12 aggravating factors, as listed under Title 16, Chapter 3, Article 1, Section 16-3-20 of the South Carolina Code of Laws. Among them are murder involving another felony such as rape, robbery or "physical torture", murder of a law enforcement or correctional officer during or because of the performance of his duties, murder committed for pecuniary gain, and murder of a child under the age of 11.

South Carolina also provides for the death penalty for criminal sexual conduct with a minor under 11 if the offender was a repeat offender, but such law is unenforceable under Kennedy v. Louisiana.

Popular culture
Stephen King's novel The Stand includes a detailed discussion of the fictional case of Markham v. South Carolina, in which the  US Supreme Court ruled that lengthy delays in capital crime cases constituted cruel and unusual punishment, and hence expedited the trial and execution.  No such case actually exists.

See also
List of people executed in South Carolina
List of death row inmates in South Carolina
Crime in South Carolina

References 

 
South Carolina
Crime in South Carolina
South Carolina law